Nakseongdae is a park located in Gwanak, Seoul. It is the birthplace of General Gang Gamchan in Goryeo Dynasty.

Etymology

Nakseongdae means "the place where a star was fallen" in Hanja. The star means general Gang Gamchan, who became the hero to defeat the large force of Khitan (Liao dynasty). It is originated from the legend that General Gam's mother bore him after she had dreamed that a star was fallen to her breast.

History

In 1972, this place was designated as Seoul City Historical Legacy No.4. In 1973-1974, Anguksa Shrine was constructed. This shrine is dedicated to General Gam. Stone wall of 409 meter circumference was built to surround it. And in front of the shrine, a bronze statue of General Gam was built. There stands a pagoda of 4.48m height which was made in 13C. It is said that Japanese soldiers during Japanese invasions of Korea (1592–1598) destroyed this pagoda and robbed the treasures hidden inside.  And they damaged this site to humiliate General Gam and Korean patriotism.

Surroundings 

Seoul National University, the most prominent university of South Korea moved from downtown of Seoul near to Nakseongdae in the year 1977. So the rear gate of Seoul National University is very close to Nakseongdae.  The International Vaccine Institute (IVI) and the SNU dormitory are very closely located to Nakseongdae.

Near the park is Nakseongdae Station of Seoul Subway Line 2. 

Since Nakseongdae sounds like acronym of Nakseong University in Korean language, Nakseongdae becomes a nickname of SNU for those who do not want to sound like bragging by telling others about their university.

Parks in Seoul